Sthenias puncticornis is a species of beetle in the family Cerambycidae. It was described by Léon Fairmaire in 1891.

References

puncticornis
Beetles described in 1891